Pitcairnia calderonii is a plant species in the genus Pitcairnia. This species is native to Chiapas, Guatemala, El Salvador, and Honduras.

References

calderonii
Flora of Chiapas
Flora of Central America
Plants described in 1932